Redhill Peninsula is a low rise private housing estate in Tai Tam, Hong Kong. It is built at a round-shaped peninsula situated in Southern District towards Tai Tam Harbour and Turtle Cove. The peninsula includes a 113 metres hill named 'Red Hill'.

Redhill Peninsula has been developed by Sino Land and Chinachem into 4 phases that were completed from 1990 to 1992. The houses appear to have been built on three levels.

References

External links

Information of Redhill Peninsula from Sino Group

Residential buildings completed in 1990
Residential buildings completed in 1991
Residential buildings completed in 1992
Tai Tam
Sino Group
Chinachem
Private housing estates in Hong Kong
1990 establishments in Hong Kong